Thomas Brewster Jr. (born 10 April 1974) is a Scottish curler from Aberdeen, Scotland. He is currently the coach of the Ross Paterson men's team.

Career
Brewster is a former World Junior champion, having won the title in 1995. The Scottish team which consisted of Paul Westwood, Ronald Brewster, Steve Still and David Murdoch finished 8–1 after the round robin, and defeated Sweden's Henrik Edlund and then Germany's Daniel Herberg to win the championship.

Brewster has skipped Scotland to two European Mixed titles, in 2006 and in 2009.

Brewster has been a frequent participant in World Curling Tour events, perhaps more so than the more successful Scottish teams. He has won a total of six WCT events, all European events. He has played in 12 Grand Slam events, advancing to the quarterfinals on five occasions (but never further).

In 2002, Brewster was invited to play in his first World championship. He was an alternate for the Warwick Smith team which won a bronze medal in 2002. Brewster won his first Scottish men's title in 2011, and represented Scotland at the 2011 Ford World Men's Curling Championship, finishing second in the round robin and winning the silver in the final against Canada's Jeff Stoughton.  In 2012 he again won silver, this time losing in the final against Canadian skip Glenn Howard.

2014 Olympic team
Former World Champion David Murdoch was added to the Brewster rink in 2012 to boost the team's chances at the 2014 Winter Olympics. The team did not find immediate success in their first major tournament, finishing 7th at the 2012 European Curling Championships. After then, Brewster was bumped to third on the team, with Murdoch skipping. This turned out to be a successful lineup change, as the team won a bronze medal at the 2013 Ford World Men's Curling Championship. The team then went on to take bronze at the 2013 European Championships.

Brewster made his Team GB Winter Olympic debut at the Sochi 2014 Winter Olympics. Brewster would not see any action at the games, as he would be the team's alternate for the event. However, he and teammates David Murdoch, Michael Goodfellow, Scott Andrews and Greg Drummond wound up winning the silver medal, after losing to Canada's Brad Jacobs rink in the gold medal game. The team disbanded in 2014.

Following the 2014 Olympics, Brewster focused on fitness training, in order to overcome limitations due to a broken leg he suffered when he was younger. In a 2016 interview with The Times he said that this training had allowed him to significantly improve his technique. Subsequently he formed part of a new rink with Hammy McMillan Jr., Ross Patterson, and Glen Muirhead. In 2016 Brewster guided his rink to victories over Team Murdoch in both the Scottish championships in February and the European Playdowns in October. Team Brewster also competed for Scotland at the 2016 World Men's Curling Championship, although they missed out on a medal: subsequently the team were passed over for selection for the 2018 Winter Olympics in favour of Kyle Smith's rink.

Personal life
Tom is now the Ice rink manager at Curl Aberdeen. He is married to Kim Brewster, and has one son and one daughter.

References

External links
 

1974 births
Living people
Scottish male curlers
British male curlers
Olympic curlers of Great Britain
Olympic silver medallists for Great Britain
Olympic medalists in curling
Curlers at the 2014 Winter Olympics
Medalists at the 2014 Winter Olympics
Sportspeople from St Andrews
Scottish curling coaches